Glenea dimidiata is a species of beetle in the family Cerambycidae. It was described by Johan Christian Fabricius in 1801. It is known from Malaysia and Indonesia.

Subspecies
 Glenea dimidiata arcuatefasciata Pic, 1943
 Glenea dimidiata dimidiata (Fabricius, 1801)
 Glenea dimidiata semigrisea Aurivillius, 1913
 Glenea dimidiata sumbawana Aurivillius, 1925

References

dimidiata
Beetles described in 1801